Étienne Boulay (born March 10, 1983) is a former Canadian football safety. He most recently played for the Toronto Argonauts of the Canadian Football League, with whom he won the 100th Grey Cup championship. He was drafted 16th overall by the Alouettes in the 2006 CFL Draft. He played college football for the New Hampshire Wildcats.

Boulay signed with the New York Jets of the National Football League in 2008 but was released in preseason.

Early years
Boulay played at Kent School in Kent, Connecticut. In 2001, he led Kent to the New England Class A Championship in football as a running back, defensive back, and team captain. Following the season, Étienne was voted the New England Class A Player of the Year for 2001. In high school, he attended College Jean-Eudes in Montreal, Quebec, playing defensive back for the football team.

College career
He played for the New Hampshire Wildcats from 2002 to 2005. He played 13 games in 2004, making 65 tackles and intercepting three passes. He also registered 66 tackles and five interceptions in 2005.

Professional career

Montreal Alouettes
He was drafted in the second round (16th pick) in the 2006 CFL Draft by the Montreal Alouettes. That season, he finished fifth in the CFL with 20 special teams tackles and won the East Division Most Outstanding Rookie, 2006 and the Alouettes Most Outstanding Rookie, 2006 awards.

New York Jets
On January 18, 2008, he signed a contract with the New York Jets. He was waived on July 24 following the signing of first-round draft pick Vernon Gholston.

Return to Montreal
Boulay returned to Montreal in August 2008. On June 15, 2012, Boulay was released by the Alouettes.

Toronto Argonauts
On July 15, 2012, Boulay signed a one-year contract with the Toronto Argonauts, later winning the 100th Grey Cup. He was released on December 19, 2012.

References

External links 
Versus Blogpage

1983 births
American football safeties
Canadian expatriate American football people in the United States
Canadian football defensive backs
Canadian Football League Rookie of the Year Award winners
Canadian players of American football
French Quebecers
Kent School alumni
Living people
Montreal Alouettes players
New Hampshire Wildcats football players
New York Jets players
Players of Canadian football from Quebec
Canadian football people from Montreal